Ward Mountain is the high point of the Egan Range in south-central White Pine County of eastern Nevada. It ranks thirty-fourth among the most topographically prominent peaks in the state. The Ward Charcoal Ovens State Historic Park is located on the mountain's eastern flank.

References

External links 
 
 Ward Mountain Recreation Area, photos and info, by BLM
 Ward Mountain Recreation Area, map & information

Mountains of Nevada
Mountains of White Pine County, Nevada
Humboldt–Toiyabe National Forest